Owen Roughwood (9 June 1876, in London – 30 May 1947, in Kent) was a British stage and film actor. He married actress Hilda Anthony in 1913.

Selected filmography
 Under the Red Robe (1915)
 The Queen Mother (1916)
 The Four Just Men (1921)
 The Beloved Vagabond (1923)

References

External links
 

1876 births
1947 deaths
English male film actors
English male silent film actors
20th-century English male actors
English male stage actors
Male actors from London
20th-century British male actors